Darren Lemke (born ) is an American screenwriter who has been active in the film industry since the late 1990s. His first major screenwriting credit was for Shrek Forever After (2010), which he wrote with Josh Klausner. Lemke directed the thriller film Lost (2004), which he also wrote.

Background
Raised in Carlstadt, New Jersey, he went to Paramus Catholic High School in Paramus, New Jersey. After high school, he attended the School of Visual Arts in Manhattan, New York to study screenwriting. In 1997, he sold two pitches to Touchstone Pictures for Tony Scott to direct; one of the pitches became Gemini Man, which was released in 2019. In 2005, Lemke pitched the idea of adapting the English fairy tale "Jack and the Beanstalk" with computer-generated imagery. By 2013, Jack the Giant Slayer was directed by Bryan Singer.

Lemke is one of six executive producers for the 2021 TV series The Wheel of Time.

Credits

Notes

References

External links

20th-century births
American screenwriters
Living people
Year of birth missing (living people)
People from Carlstadt, New Jersey
Paramus Catholic High School alumni
School of Visual Arts alumni